Daisy Geyser is a geyser in the Upper Geyser Basin of Yellowstone National Park in the United States.

Daisy Geyser is part of the Daisy Group. It was named prior to 1890 by the Hague Party. It erupts every 110 to 240 minutes for a period of 3 to 5 minutes and is one of the most predictable geysers in the park. The interval between eruptions can be temporarily altered by an eruption of nearby Splendid Geyser. To a smaller degree, Brilliant Pool and Comet Geyser are influenced by Splendid and Daisy.

Daisy Geyser was one of the Yellowstone geysers that had its eruption interval disrupted by the 2002 Denali earthquake, in Alaska. Immediately after the quake, the interval rapidly decreased but returned to previous intervals over the course of a few weeks.

References

 

Geothermal features of Yellowstone National Park
Geysers of Wyoming
Geothermal features of Teton County, Wyoming
Geysers of Teton County, Wyoming